Joseph J. Levelis (born January 6, 1961) is a former American football offensive tackle in the United States Football League for the Oklahoma and Arizona Outlaws. He played college football at the University of Iowa.

Early years
Levelis attended Lindenhurst Senior High School, where he was a starter at offensive tackle. He accepted a football scholarship from the University of Iowa. He became a starter at left guard as a sophomore. He was moved to right tackle as a junior, to replace the departed Brett Miller.

Professional career
Levelis was selected by the Dallas Cowboys in the eleventh round (304th overall) of the 1984 NFL Draft. He opted to instead sign with the United States Football League.

On May 9, 1984, he was signed as a free agent by the Oklahoma Outlaws of the United States Football League. He was a backup offensive tackle and played 2 seasons until the league folded.

Personal life
Levelis was a football graduate assistant at the University of Iowa.

References

External links
Joe Levelis Stats

1961 births
Living people
Players of American football from Columbus, Ohio
American football offensive tackles
Iowa Hawkeyes football players
Oklahoma Outlaws players
Arizona Outlaws players